Henry Hemming (born December 1979) is an English non-fiction author. In 2017 it was announced that his book, M: Maxwell Knight, MI5's Greatest Spymaster, based on the life of Maxwell Knight, would be adapted for television by Mammoth Screen with Oscar-nominated screenwriter Matt Charman attached as lead writer.

In order to write the book about Knight, Hemming reviewed declassified MI5 files, interviewed former MI5 agents as well as some of Knight's family.

Personal life
Henry Hemming is married to the BBC radio presenter Helena Merriman. They have two children and live in London. He is the son of John Hemming, explorer, author and former Director of the Royal Geographical Society, and Sukie Hemming, former Director of Development at the British Museum.

Selected publications
 Offscreen: Four Young Artists in the Middle East. Booth-Clibborn Editions, 2004. 
 Misadventure in the Middle East: Travels as a Tramp, Artist and Spy. Nicholas Brealey Publishing, 2007.
 In Search of the English Eccentric: A Journey. John Murray, 2008. 
 Together: How Small Groups Achieve Big Things. John Murray, 2011. 
 Churchill's Iceman: The True Story of Geoffrey Pyke: Genius, Fugitive, Spy. Preface Publishing, 2014. 
 M: Maxwell Knight, MI5's Greatest Spymaster. Preface Publishing, 2017. 
 Agents of Influence.  PublicAffairs, 2019.

References

External links 
http://henryhemming.com/

1979 births
Writers from London
English non-fiction writers
Living people
Alumni of Newcastle University